Padang Station (PD) is a railway station of the Pulau Aie–Padang Panjang railway and Teluk Bayur–Padang railway located at Jl. Stasiun No. 1, Simpang Haru, East Padang, Padang, West Sumatra.

History 
Staatsspoorwegen ter Sumatra's Westkust (SSS), a division of Staatsspoorwegen, was built a railroad in West Sumatra based on a concession issued by the Dutch East Indies government which was approved by the Dutch parliament in September 1887. Construction began on 6 July 1889 to connect Padang with the well-known Ombilin coal mine in Sawahlunto. In detail, the railroad line consists of Emmahaven (Teluk Bayur)-Padang Station which was inaugurated on 1 October 1892, and – on 1 July 1891.

Presently the railroad to Pulau Aie which starts from track 1 has been reactivated and the expansion of the station building has been carried out.

Services
Railway services that utilise this station :

References

External links
 

Buildings and structures in Padang
Railway stations in West Sumatra